Antonio Melchioni (Pallanza, Province of Novara, 1847 - Turin, 1921) was an Italian painter, of both watercolors and oils. He was eclectic in subjects, but was best known for his genre subjects.

Biography

In 1875 at Genoa, he exhibited Lo studio del pittore; in 1877 also at Genoa, Passatempo nell'harem; in 1879 at Turin Passioni d'amore; in 1882 at Turin, Baccante; and in 1885 at Milan, Le amiche. He also painted sea-scapes painted on site such as Riviera di Levante, exhibited in 1879 at Genoa.

He was a resident of Turin. Among his works: Studio d'un povero pittore, exhibited at Turin in 1880 along with: Rèverie. This latter painting was also displayed at the 1881 Milan Exhibition alongside Baccante; Cantiniera; Allo specchio; and L'attesa amorosa. This latter painting was also exhibited in 1884 at Turin. He continued to exhibit until 1908.

References

1847 births
1941 deaths
19th-century Italian painters
Italian male painters
20th-century Italian painters
Painters from Turin
Italian genre painters
19th-century Italian male artists
People from Pallanza
20th-century Italian male artists